HMP Five Wells, also referred to as Wellingborough Prison or HMP Wellingborough, due to it being built on same site as the latter, is a Category C men's prison, located in Wellingborough, Northamptonshire, England. With a maximum capacity of 1,680, it is the largest prison in the East Midlands, and one of the largest in the UK. The prison is operated by G4S.

History
It was announced in June 2018 that a new category C prison would be built in Wellingborough on the site of the now demolished HM Prison Wellingborough, which was closed in 2012.

In 2020, it was announced the prison would be called "HMP Five Wells", as voted for by Wellingborough residents.

The 9 buildings of the prison took 45 weeks to build and were completed in late 2020, costing £253,000,000. The first inmates arrived at the prison in early 2022.

In January 2023, videos were released online of inmates smoking Cannabis and taking shots of alcoholic drinks including different varieties of vodka and rum held in inconspicuous bottles, most notably a Robinsons juice bottle. This furtherly perpetuated the controversy and criticism surrounding the prison, as well as of G4S.

Criticism
There were various forms of protest about the construction of the prison, including graffiti around Wellingborough town, and most notably a protest in April 2021 outside the prison in which people concreted their arms together, preventing construction vehicles and deliveries entering the prison. This resulted in five arrests due to protesters allegedly becoming hostile to staff and police. The protest was targeted towards the prison's constructor, Kier Group. Multiple protests similar to this occurred throughout the prison's construction.

References

External links

Wellingborough
Wellingborough
Wellingborough